This is a list of Old Newingtonians with Australian Dictionary of Biography biographies. Old Newingtonians are alumni of Newington College, an independent Uniting Church single-sex primary and secondary day school for boys, located in the inner-west of Sydney, New South Wales, Australia.

See also 

 Newington College
 List of Old Newingtonians
 List of Old Newingtonians awarded Imperial and Australian honours

References

External links 
 Newington College website
 ONU website
 Australian Dictionary of Biography website

Lists of people educated in New South Wales by school affiliation
 
Sydney-related lists
Lists of Australian men